Ruth Glacier is a glacier in Denali National Park and Preserve in the U.S. state of Alaska. Its upper reaches are approximately 3 vertical miles below the summit of Denali. The glacier's "Great Gorge" is one mile wide, and drops almost 2,000 feet over 10 miles, with crevasses along the surface. Above the surface on both sides are 4,900-foot granite cliffs. From the top of the cliffs to the bottom of the glacier is a height exceeding that of the Grand Canyon. Ruth Glacier moves at a rate of three feet per day and was measured to be 4,000 feet thick in 1983.

Surrounding the Ruth Gorge are many mountains of the Alaska Range, including the Mooses Tooth, Mount Dickey, Mount Bradley, Mount Wake, Mount Johnson, and London Tower with highly technical ice and rock climbs on their faces.

History

In 1903, the glacier was explored by physician and ethnographer Frederick Cook, who named it after his youngest daughter.

See also
 List of glaciers
 Fake Peak

References

Glaciers of Matanuska-Susitna Borough, Alaska
Glaciers of Denali National Park and Preserve
Denali
Glaciers of Alaska